Majid Jalali  (born 6 September 1956 in Tehran, Iran) is an Iranian football manager and a former player. He has served as the manager in several clubs in Iran like Pas Tehran, Saba Battery, Foolad, and also national football teams at various youth levels. He is also currently the secretary general of the Iran Football Coaches Association.

Playing career

Club career
He was born on 1 January 1956 in Tehran. His parents are originally from Yazd Province, Pandar. He started his club career with Alborz Tehran at the age of 17. Later, he played for other Tehran clubs like Vahdat Tehran and Shahin.

International career
In 1982, he was invited to Iran national football team but he has never played for the national team.

Coaching career
Jalali started his coaching career at age of 21 by coaching Vahdat's youth team while he was playing for the senior team. He officially coached Vahdat's senior team as of 1986. Jalali is most notable for his role as coach for Pas Tehran and Saba Battery and in recent years when he won the league and Hazfi Cup with these teams, but he had few unsuccessful terms in Shahid Ghandi and Esteghlal Ahvaz. He has also served as coach of Iran's under-16, and under-20 teams, as well as, Iran's armed forces football team. He was the manager of Foolad in 2008–09 season but left the club because the chairman despite his good results was negotiating with other coaches for the season after. He returned to the club few weeks after the season where the club failed to win any matches and finished 10th in the league. He announced that he will not be renewed his contract at the end of 2011–12 season. After spending one season out, he signed a one-year contract with Tractor on 27 May 2013. He also had bids from Rah Ahan Sorinet and Championship side Brighton & Hove Albion. He was sacked by the club on 19 January 2014. On 13 May 2014, he was named as head coach of Saipa with signing a three-year contract. Jalali in 2019 year connected head coach of Nassaji Mazandaran.

Statistics

Honours

Manager
Vahdat
Tehran Football League (U-16 sides): 1982, 1985 (runner-up)

Iran (Armed Forces)
World Military Cup: 1995 (runner-up)

Pas Tehran
Iran Pro League: 2003–04

Saba Battery Tehran
Hazfi Cup: 2004–05
Iranian Super Cup: 2005

Individual
Iranian Manager of the Year: 2004
Navad Manager of the Month (1): October 2017

References

External links

  

1956 births
Living people
Iranian footballers
People from Tehran
Shahin FC players
Iran international footballers
Association football midfielders
Iranian football managers
Tractor S.C. managers
Saba Qom F.C. managers
F.C. Nassaji Mazandaran managers
Persian Gulf Pro League managers